Sara Fernández Roldán (born 5 December 1994) is a Spanish Paralympic athlete who competes in international track and field competitions, she competes in sprint and long jump. She is a World bronze medalist and a two-time European bronze medalist.

References

1994 births
Living people
Sportspeople from Seville
Paralympic athletes of Spain
Spanish female sprinters
Spanish female long jumpers
Athletes (track and field) at the 2016 Summer Paralympics
Athletes (track and field) at the 2020 Summer Paralympics
Medalists at the World Para Athletics Championships
Medalists at the World Para Athletics European Championships
20th-century Spanish women
21st-century Spanish women